Senna petersiana, the monkey pod or eared senna, is an African deciduous shrub or small tree. The leaves are compound with about 12 opposite lanceolate leaflets, dark green above and lighter below. Its copious bright yellow flowers are carried on erect multi-branched inflorescences. The species was formerly placed in the genus Cassia.

It occurs naturally in Cameroon, Central African Republic, DRC, South Sudan, Ethiopia, Kenya, Tanzania, Mozambique, Zimbabwe, South Africa and Eswatini. It was introduced to several Indian Ocean islands and became naturalized in far northern Madagascar.

References

petersiana